Mati Lember (born 21 July 1985) is a retired Estonian football player who played in different Estonian association football teams, with a small experience in the Estonia national football team between 2004–2007. He used to play in the position of defensive midfielder.

In 2017 he decided to retire from professional football, at the age of 32 years old.

Club career

International career
During his national team career he was capped 2 times. He debuted internationally in 2004. He also played for the Estonia national team U-21 more than 20 times.

References

Living people
Footballers from Tallinn
1985 births
Estonian footballers
Estonia international footballers
JK Tallinna Kalev players
Nõmme Kalju FC players
Viljandi JK Tulevik players
FC Flora players
FC Valga players
Association football midfielders
JK Tervis Pärnu players
FC Kuressaare players